The 2017 FIBA 3x3 World Cup was held in Nantes, France, and was contested by 20 teams.

Participating teams
All five FIBA zones were represented. The top 20 teams, including the hosts, based on the FIBA National Federation ranking qualified for the tournament.

Players

Preliminary round

Pool A

Pool B

Pool C

Pool D

Knockout stage

Final standings

Awards

Individual awards
Most Valuable Player
 Dejan Majstorović (SRB)
Team of the Tournament
 Dušan Bulut (SRB)
 Jesper Jobse (NED)
 Dejan Majstorović (SRB)

Individual contests

Dunk contest
Overall format
Each player had 75 seconds and 3 attempts per round to complete a dunk with the first successful dunk being considered as the valid one. A jury of five members rated each dunk by assigning 5 to 10 points to it (by each member) or 0 points if the dunk was unsuccessful.

Qualification
Format
The qualification round took place on June 19. Each player competed in two rounds and four players with the highest score then advanced to the knockout stage. In a case of ties, the tied players would perform again and if they were still tied, the jury decided which player advanced.

Knockout stage
The knockout stage consisting of a semi-final and a final took place on June 21.
Semi-final
Top two players advanced to the final round.

Final
The time limit was eliminated for the final and the two players competed over three rounds instead of two.

Results

References

External links
Official website

Men's
2017 in men's sport